This is a list of known American football players who have played for the Miami Seahawks of the All-America Football Conference. It includes players that have played at least one match with the team.



B
Ed Bell,
Paul Berezney,
Lamar Blount

C
Daryl Cato, 
Marty Comer

D
Bill Daley, 
Bill Davis, 
Lamar Davis

E
Kay Eakin,
Gene Ellenson, 
Dick Erdlitz

F
Terry Fox

G
Monk Gafford, 
Fred Gloden

H
George Hekkers, 
Ken Holley,
Harry Hopp,
Dick Horne,
Frank Hrabetin

J
Preston Johnston,
Dub Jones,
Hal Jungmichel

K
Stan Koslowski,
Andy Kowalski,
Joe Krivonak

M
Walt McDonald,
Mickey McDonnell,  
Fondren Mitchell

N
Jimmy Nelson

O
Mitchell Olenski

P
Bob Paffrath, 
Hamp Pool, 
Charley Price, 
Marion Pugh, 
Cal Purdin

R
Don Reece,
Jim Reynolds

S
Prince Scott,
Jim Sivell,
Stan Stasica

T
Jim Tarrant,
John Tavener,
Chuck Taylor,
Frank Trigilio

U
Hub Ulrich

V
Johnny Vardian

W
Ken Whitlow,
Jack Williams,
Al Wukits

Z
George Zorich

References
1946 Miami Seahawks roster

 
Lists of American football players
Miami-related lists